Greta Marie Andersen (married names Jeppesen and Sonnichsen and Veress, 1 May 1927 – 6 February 2023) was a Danish swimmer who won a gold and a silver medal in 100 m freestyle events at the 1948 Summer Olympics. In the mid-1950s she moved to the United States, where she set several world records in marathon swimming in the distances up to 50 miles.

Early life
Andersen was born on 1 May 1927 in Copenhagen to Mourits Peter Andersen and Charlotte Emerentze Benedikte Nielsen.

Swimming career
Andersen began swimming in a club aged 16 while also doing gymnastics. In 1947, she won two European medals at her first international competition. Next year she won two more medals at the London Olympics, a gold in the 100m freestyle and a silver in the 4 × 100m freestyle relay. She failed to finish her 400m freestyle race due to sudden stomach cramps – she fainted and was rescued from drowning by fellow competitors Nancy Lees and Elemér Szathmáry. According to her recollections, an injection her coach gave her to delay her period caused her legs to be paralyzed and for her to subsequently faint. In 1949, Andersen set a world record in the 100 yard freestyle at 58.2 seconds, which stood for seven years. She took part in three events at the 1952 Olympics, but could not use one leg due to a recent knee surgery, and failed to medal. Her best result at those Games was a fourth place in the 4 × 100m freestyle relay. During her career in Europe, she won nine individual Danish titles, several team titles, and four individual Scandinavian titles.

In 1953 she immigrated to Long Beach, California, and obtained American citizenship 1959 while still married to her second husband John Sonnichsen in Long Beach. There she switched to marathon swimming and became the first person to swim a major channel both ways (the Santa Catalina Channel in 1958). She also set world records in the 10, 25 and 50 miles. Between 1957 and 1965 she crossed the English Channel six times, setting a record for most Channel swims by a woman, as well as a speed record for women at 10:59 h in 1958. She also set an unofficial record for the longest Channel swim, while trying for 23 hours to cross the Channel forth and back in 1964.

In 1969, Andersen was inducted into the International Swimming Hall of Fame (ISHOF). In 2015, ISHOF honored her with a Lifetime Achievement Award.

Personal life
After a previous marriage (Valby, Copenhagen, 1952) to Danish engineer Helge Jeppesen ended in divorce, Andersen married John Sonnichsen, with whom she opened a swimming school in Los Alamitos in 1960. The school existed until 1980. Andersen was among the pioneers in baby swimming, and continued as swimming instructor also after the school had closed. Andersen and Sonnichsen later divorced, and she married Hungarian-born doctor Andre Veress.

Andersen died at her home in Solvang, California, on 6 February 2023, at the age of 95.

Books

See also
 List of members of the International Swimming Hall of Fame

References

External links 
 

1927 births
2023 deaths
Danish emigrants to the United States
Danish female freestyle swimmers
Danish female long-distance swimmers
English Channel swimmers
European Aquatics Championships medalists in swimming
Medalists at the 1948 Summer Olympics
Naturalized citizens of the United States
Olympic gold medalists for Denmark
Olympic gold medalists in swimming
Olympic silver medalists for Denmark
Olympic swimmers of Denmark
People from Solvang, California
Swimmers at the 1948 Summer Olympics
Swimmers at the 1952 Summer Olympics
Swimmers from Copenhagen